Nationality words link to articles with information on the nation's poetry or literature (for instance, Irish or Vietnam).

Events

Works published

Great Britain
 Anonymous, Adam bell, Clim of the Clough, and William of Cloudesly, an outlaw ballad, reprinted numerous times through the mid-17th century (a continuation, Young Cloudeslie, was published in 1608 in poetry)
 Anonymous, Octavian, publication year uncertain (1504–1506); written in the mid-14th century from a French version; among the many themes the work draws on are the St. Eustace legend and the "Calumniated Wife"
 Anonymous, Sir Torrent of Portingale, publication year uncertain; written in the late 14th to early 15th century
 Alexander Barclay, published anonymously; publication year uncertain, London: "Imprinted be ... Richarde Pynson", translation from the French of Pierre Gringoire

Other
 Jean Lemaire de Belges, Belgian Waloon poet writing in French:
 La couronne margaritique (this year or 1504), on the death of Philibert II, Duke of Savoy, the second husband of Archduchess Margaret of Austria, to whom the author was court poet;
 Epîtres de l'amant vert, mock epistles presented as having been written by the pet parrot of Marguerite d'Autriche; the parrot dies from its love for the woman; Walloon poet published in France, where he was court poet to d'Autriche
 Pietro Bembo, Gli Asolani'', a dialogue on courtly love, with poems reminiscent of Boccaccio and Petrarch (see also second, revised edition 1530)

Births
Death years link to the corresponding "[year] in poetry" article:
 February 4 – Mikolaj Rej (died 1569), Polish poet, politician and musician
Also:
 Lodovico Castelvetro born about this year (died 1571), Italian literary critic
 Giovanni Pietro Astemio (died 1567), Italian, Latin-language poet
 Nicholas Bourbon in this year or 1503  (died 1550), French court preceptor and poet
 John Wedderburn, birth year uncertain (died 1556), Scottish religious reformer and poet
 Nicholas Udall, born this year, according to one source, or in 1504, according to others (died 1556), English playwright, poet, cleric, pederast and schoolmaster
 Georg Wickram (died 1562), German poet and novelist
 Wu Cheng'en (died 1580), Chinese novelist and poet

Deaths
Birth years link to the corresponding "[year] in poetry" article:
 July 17 – Filippo Beroaldo (born 1453), Italian writer, editor, translator, commentator and poet in Italian and Latin
 Also:
 Tito Vespasiano Strozzi died about this year (born 1424), according to at least some sources, 1425 according to another, Italian, Latin-language poet
 Robert Wydow (born 1446), English poet, church musician, and religious figure

See also

 Poetry
 16th century in poetry
 16th century in literature
 French Renaissance literature
 Grands Rhétoriqueurs
 Renaissance literature
 Spanish Renaissance literature

Notes

16th-century poetry
Poetry